The Arabic name , romanized as emarat, is the internationalized country code top-level domain for the United Arab Emirates. The ASCII name of this domain in the Domain Name System of the Internet is xn--mgbaam7a8h, using the Internationalizing Domain Names in Applications (IDNA) procedure in the translation of the Unicode representation of the script version. The domain was installed in the Domain Name System on 5 May 2010.

The first second-level sub domain is ‎.‎ which is transliterated as arabi.emarat.

The United Arab Emirates is also assigned the country code top-level domain .ae.

The dotEmarat Sunrise Period started from 17 October 2010 for a duration of 2 months, ending on 15 December 2010. This period was exclusively for all registered trademark owners to apply for a dotEmarat domain name.

References

Country code top-level domains
Internet in the United Arab Emirates
Computer-related introductions in 2010